Sherman Santiwiwatthanaphong (born 9 November 1996) is a Thai professional golfer playing on the Epson Tour.

Early life and amateur career 
Santiwiwatthanaphong started playing golf at the age of 13.  She enjoys watching movies. She is also known by her nickname, "Champagne".

In 2013, Santiwiwatthanaphong secured her first professional win on her 17th birthday when she won the PTT Global Chemical Thailand Ladies Open on the Ladies Asian Golf Tour as an amateur.

Professional career 
Santiwiwatthanaphong turned professional in 2014. In 2015, she played 14 events in her rookie year on the Symetra Tour. She recorded four top-10 finishes including her maiden win at the season-ending Symetra Tour Championship.

In 2016, Santiwiwatthanaphong mainly played on the Symetra Tour which she made 17 cuts from 19 starts with seven top-ten finishes. She claimed her second Symetra Tour title at the Island Resort Championship and finished sixth on the money list to earn LPGA membership for the 2017 season.

In 2017, Santiwiwatthanaphong played in 21 LPGA Tour events and recorded a season-best at the Thornberry Creek LPGA Classic with a tied for 11th place.

In 2018, Santiwiwatthanaphong made ten cuts from 21 starts on the LPGA Tour, including her career-best at the Kingsmill Championship that she finished tied for seventh. She also made the cut at the 2018 Evian Championship and finished 71st.

In 2019, Santiwiwatthanaphong played 18 tournaments on the LPGA Tour and made three cuts. She shotted her career-best round of 8-under 63 in the first round at the Walmart NW Arkansas Championship.

Amateur wins 
this list may be incomplete
2013 Thailand Ladies Amateur

Professional wins (7)

Ladies Asian Golf Tour wins (1)

Symetra Tour wins (2) 
 2015 (1) Symetra Tour Championship
 2016 (1) Island Resort Championship

All Thailand Golf Tour wins (1) 
 2013 (1) Singha Classic (as an amateur)

Thai LPGA Tour wins (3) 
 2014 (1) 8th Singha-SAT Thai LPGA Championship
 2021 (2) BGC 3rd Thai LPGA Championship, BGC-Betagro 5th Thai LPGA Championship

Results in LPGA majors 
Results not in chronological order.

 

CUT = missed the half-way cut

Team appearances 
Professional
International Crown (representing Thailand): 2018

References

External links 

Sherman Santiwiwatthanaphong
LPGA Tour golfers
1996 births
Living people
Sherman Santiwiwatthanaphong